Christopher Martin (born July 10, 1962) is an American rapper and actor, who is the latter half of the late 1980s/early 1990s hip-hop/comedy duo Kid 'n Play.

Career
Martin's stage name, Play, is derived from his original MC name, Playboy, which he began using while in a music group, Quicksilver and the Super Lovers, which featured producer Hurby Luv Bug. While performing with this group, Martin met Christopher Reid, who performed as Kid Coolout in the group The Turnout Brothers. When their respective groups dissolved, Martin and Reid decided to perform as a duo. By shortening their nicknames, it would lead to the start of the group Kid 'n Play which featured the pair rapping and dancing together.

With Kid, Play recorded three albums and starred in five hip-hop based comedy films: House Party, House Party 2, Class Act, House Party 3, and House Party: Tonight’s the Night.

After the duo split in 1995, Play became a born-again Christian and focused on Christian hip hop. He is the founder and CEO of HP4 Digital, a pre- and post-production multimedia company for film, digital media, and theater.

In 2010, Play starred as an undercover DEA agent in the independent film The Return.

Play was one of the judges for the 8th annual Independent Music Awards to support independent artists.

He studied acting at HB Studio in New York City.

Personal life
Play was married to actress/model Shari Headley from May 1993 until they divorced in June 1995. In April 1994, Headley gave birth to their son, Skyler Martin.

Discography

With Kid 'n Play

Albums
 1988: 2 Hype
 1990: Funhouse
 1991: Face the Nation

Acting career

Television
Kid 'n Play - Self (1990, animated cartoon, NBC)
Sealab 2021 - Self (2002, Adult Swim)
Bigger - Julius (2021, BET)

Film
House Party (1990) – Peter "Play" Martin 
House Party 2 (1991) – Peter "Play" Martin
Class Act (1992) Michael Charles "Blade" Brown
House Party 3 (1994) – Peter "Play" Martin
Rising to the Top (1999)
Welcome to Durham, USA (2007)
House Party: Tonight's the Night (2013) – Peter "Play" Martin (cameo)
House Party (2023) - Himself

References
Notes

External links

1962 births
American male rappers
Living people
American male film actors
African-American male actors
African-American Christians
Place of birth missing (living people)
Male actors from New York (state)
Rappers from New York City
Male actors from Durham, North Carolina
Musicians from Durham, North Carolina
People from Queens, New York
American chief executives
21st-century American rappers
21st-century American male musicians
20th-century African-American male singers
21st-century African-American musicians